The members of the House of Assembly of Dominica comprise 21 Representatives, 9 Senators, and the Speaker of the House and Attorney General.

Political parties
DLP - Dominica Labour Party
UWP - United Workers' Party
PPOD - People's Party of Dominica

2019–Present

Representatives

Senators

2014–2019

2009–2014

Representatives

Senators
Due to the opposition boycott of the House of Assembly, only five senators were initially appointed.

Speaker of the House
Alix Boyd Knights

2005–2009

Representatives

Senators

Speaker of the House
Alix Boyd Knights

2000–2005

1995–2000

References

 
House of Assembly
Dominica